Manjula Priyantha (born 15 October 1980) is a Sri Lankan cricketer. He played thirteen first-class and nineteen List A matches for multiple domestic sides in Sri Lanka between 2000 and 2009. His last first-class match was for Seeduwa Raddoluwa Cricket Club in the 2009–10 Premier Trophy on 18 December 2009.

See also
 List of Chilaw Marians Cricket Club players

References

External links
 

1980 births
Living people
Sri Lankan cricketers
Chilaw Marians Cricket Club cricketers
Saracens Sports Club cricketers
Seeduwa Raddoluwa Cricket Club cricketers
Sinhalese Sports Club cricketers
Place of birth missing (living people)